I Wish I Knew How It Would Feel to Be Free is a live album by American jazz pianist Billy Taylor, which was originally released on the Tower label in 1968.

Reception

Allmusic awarded the album 4 stars, calling it "a good all-round showcase of Billy Taylor's playing".

Track listing
 "Pensativa" (Clare Fischer) - 8:11
 "I Wish I Knew How It Would Feel to Be Free" (Billy Taylor, Dick Dallas) - 4:25
 "Morning" (Fischer) - 5:23
 "T.N.T." (Ben Tucker, Grady Tate) - 4:27
 "Hard to Find" (Leroy Vinnegar) - 4:08
 "Lonesome Lover" (Teddy Castion) - 3:32
 "Sunny" (Bobby Hebb) - 4:22
 "Cag" (Taylor) - 4:22

Personnel 
Billy Taylor - piano 
Ben Tucker - bass
Grady Tate - drums

References 

1968 live albums
Billy Taylor live albums